Astathes bipartita is a species of beetle in the family Cerambycidae. It was described by Thomson in 1865. It is known from Malaysia and Sulawesi.

Subspecies
 Astathes bipartita bipartita Thomson, 1865
 Astathes bipartita weisei (Heyden, 1897)

References

B
Beetles described in 1865